Richard Goodman may refer to:

 Richard Goodman (writer) (born 1945), American writer of nonfiction
 Richard Goodman (American football) (born 1987), American football wide receiver
 Richard Bryce Goodman, American sound engineer
 Dickie Goodman (Richard Dorian Goodman), American music and record producer
 Kevin Cooper (prisoner) (born 1958 as Richard Goodman), American mass murderer

See also
 Rick Goodman, video game designer
 Richard Goodmanson, businessman
 Dic Goodman, Welsh poet